Patrick Campbell may refer to:

Patrick Campbell (British Army officer, born 1684) (1684–1751), British Army General and Member of Parliament
Patrick Campbell (Royal Navy officer) (1773–1841), Royal Navy officer
Patrick Campbell (British Army officer, born 1779) (1779–1857), British Army Major General, British agent and Consul General in Egypt
Mrs Patrick Campbell (1865–1940), British stage actress
Patrick Campbell, 3rd Baron Glenavy (1913–1980), Irish-born British journalist, humorist and television personality
Patrick J. Campbell (1918–1998), American labor leader
Patrick Campbell (INLA member) (1977–1999), volunteer in the Irish National Liberation Army who was murdered by drug dealers
Patrick Campbell (rugby union), Irish Gaelic footballer and rugby union player
Patrick T. Campbell, American educator
Pat Campbell may refer to:

Pat Campbell (broadcaster) (died 2021), American talk radio host
Pat Campbell (cartoonist), Australian cartoonist
Pat Campbell (lacrosse) (born 1977), Canadian lacrosse player

See also
Patrick Campbell Rodger (1920–2002), Anglican clergyman
Patrick Campbell-Lyons (born 1943), composer and musician
Paddy Campbell (born 1974), Gaelic footballer